Emerald Egwim (born 27 November 1995) is a Nigerian sprinter. She competed in the women's 4 × 400 metres relay at the 2017 World Championships in Athletics.

References

External links

1995 births
Living people
Nigerian female sprinters
World Athletics Championships athletes for Nigeria
Place of birth missing (living people)
21st-century Nigerian women